Shadow Kingdom is a 2021 concert film featuring American singer-songwriter Bob Dylan. Directed by Israeli-American filmmaker Alma Har'el, it was shot on a soundstage in Santa Monica, California over seven days in early 2021 while Dylan was sidelined from his Never Ending Tour due to the COVID-19 pandemic. The film features Dylan and a group of masked musicians performing 13 songs from the first half of Dylan's career in an intimate club-like setting.

Shadow Kingdom premiered via the livestream platform Veeps.com with little information about its contents having been revealed in pre-release publicity. Some viewers expected the event to be a live concert and were surprised when it turned out to be a stylized black-and-white art film featuring "pre-recorded set pieces" instead. Shadow Kingdom nonetheless earned rave reviews from critics, many of whom praised Dylan's creative re-arrangements of his early songs as well as Har'el's imaginative staging of the performances.

Synopsis
Shadow Kingdom showcases Bob Dylan in an intimate setting as he performs songs from his extensive body of work, created especially for this event. It marked his first concert performance since December 2019, and first performance since his universally acclaimed album Rough and Rowdy Ways. The earliest composition in the set list was "It's All Over Now, Baby Blue" from the 1965 album Bringing It All Back Home and the most recent composition was "What Was It You Wanted" from 1989's Oh Mercy. In addition to Dylan, who plays guitar and harmonica and sings, most of the song arrangements consist of two additional guitars, a bass and an accordion. The performance of "Forever Young" also features a dolceola.

Personnel 
 Bob Dylan – vocals, guitar, harmonica
 Alex Burke, guitar 
 Buck Meek, guitar
 Shahzad Ismaily, accordion
 Janie Cowan, upright bass
 Joshua Crumbly, guitar

Setlist

Reception 
Sam Sodomsky, writing at Pitchfork, called Shadow Kingdom a "gorgeous...concert film" in which "the 80-year-old icon sings clearly, melodically, beautifully", and noted that "Dylan seems at times to want to burst through the screen, gesturing passionately". Sodomsky also discussed director Alma Har'el's "knack for visualizing the haunted barroom production that Dylan has favored on his modern studio albums: As he sings in dusky rooms filled with cigarette smoke and lamplight, mannequins and Western characters, the whole thing takes on a surreal, ghostlike quality".

Variety's Chris Willman wrote that those who purchased advanced tickets to the Veeps livestream "did not really know much about what they were signing up for" but that "[w]hat they got, most would agree, was better — if shorter — than they imagined". Willman also praised Dylan's vocal performances ("he hasn’t sounded better in decades") and compared the "surreality" of the film's fictional setting (the non-existent "Bon Bon Club" in Marseille, France) to locations in David Lynch's Twin Peaks.

Uncut's Damien Love also invoked the work of Lynch, describing Shadow Kingdom as "deeply-felt surrealist-noir-Americana", as well as the paintings in Dylan's own "Beaten Path" series ("a handmade place of lost highways and forgotten barrooms and city lights in smeary rain; of lonely drive-in movie lots and funky diners and juke joints that all seem to float in some unfixed time that could be anywhere from the early-1930s to early tomorrow morning") and the Depression-era boarding-house setting of Conor McPherson's musical play Girl from the North Country.

Kitty Empire gave it a 5-out-of-5 star review in The Guardian, calling it "completely thrilling" and identifying the high point as Dylan's "poignant drawl on a sensational 'What Was It You Wanted', a series of accusatory questions that stress how slippery knowledge is". Empire also compared the Bon Bon club's atmosphere to "the vibe of the sleeve art of last year’s Rough and Rowdy Ways".

See also
List of songs written by Bob Dylan
List of artists who have covered Bob Dylan songs
List of Bob Dylan songs based on earlier tunes

References

External links
 

2021 films
2021 documentary films
American documentary films
American rock music films
Concert films
Films shot in Los Angeles
2020s English-language films
2020s American films
Bob Dylan